Football Club Domagnano, commonly referred to as FC Domagnano or simply Domagnano, is a Sanmarinese football club, based in Domagnano. The club was founded in 1966. Domagnano currently plays in Girone B of Campionato Sammarinese di Calcio. The team's colors are red and yellow.
Previously known as SP Domagnano, the side has been one of the most successful teams in the Campionato Sammarinese. In the 2004–05 season, Domagnano won the championship with a play-off win over S.S. Murata. As the Sammarinese champions, Domagnano entered the UEFA Cup but was defeated easily in the first qualifying round.  Some of Domagnano's rivals are S.S. Pennarossa and A.C. Libertas.

Achievements 
Campionato Sammarinese di Calcio: 4
 1988–89, 2001–02, 2002–03, 2004–05
Coppa Titano: 8
 1972, 1988, 1990, 1992, 1996, 2001, 2002, 2003
San Marino Federal Trophy: 3
 1990, 2001, 2004

European record

External links 
FSGC page
eufo.de – Team squad lists

 
Association football clubs established in 1966
Football clubs in San Marino
Former Italian football clubs
1966 establishments in San Marino